King is a subway station on Line 1 Yonge–University of the Toronto subway system. The station is located at the intersection of King Street and Yonge Street in Toronto's Financial District. Wi-Fi service is available at this station.

History

The original address for the station was 70 Yonge Street, which is still used in Toronto Transit Commission (TTC) maps, but the official website uses the address 3 King Street East, which both point to the intersection of the two streets, and the numbers are not used by nearby buildings.

A scissors crossover was installed just north of the station when the line was built, so that trains could easily crossover from one track to another, but was later removed in May 1984 during track rehabilitation because of maintenance costs. In 2012, the TTC decided to restore this crossover, as it would allow trains to turn back during service disruptions after the implementation of automatic train control, which occurred on 2020-02-24.

Station description
The station lies underneath Yonge Street at King Street, and is built on three levels. All five entrances are located on ground level, with three of them being sidewalk staircases from the northeast, southwest, and southeast corners of the Yonge Street and King Street intersection. The northwest corner entrance is through Scotia Plaza, and a semi-automatic entrance from Commerce Court East at 21 Melinda Street is staffed by a collector during rush hour. There is also an "exit only" sidewalk staircase from the southbound subway platform, just south of Melinda Street. There are no elevators in this station, and it is not accessible for persons with physical disabilities.

Below ground level are two separate concourses, located under King Street (north concourse), and under Commerce Court (south concourse). All entrances and exits connect to the north concourse except for ones along Melinda Street. Below the concourses are the subway platforms, connected by stairs and one escalator to the northbound platform on weekdays from 3:00 pm to 6:30 pm.

Gateway Newsstands located in the north concourse is the only tenant in the station.

Station improvements
As part of its Public Art Program announced in June 2017, the TTC intends to install an artwork titled Light Canopy by artist Sean Martindale. The work is an animated lighting system to be set into the ceiling above the stairwell at King station's western entrance, and will give passers-by the feeling of passing under tree foliage.

Subway infrastructure in the vicinity
North of the station, the subway travels through a scissors crossover through its tunnels underneath Yonge Street, past Queen Street, and into Queen station. South of the station, the subway continues underneath Yonge Street, until it reaches Front Street, where it turns 90 degrees west and passes through a crossover into Union station.

Nearby destinations
The destination for many people using King station is the financial district and its numerous office towers, connected to the station by the underground PATH system of pedestrian tunnels. These include the Canadian Pacific Building, Scotia Plaza, Commerce Court, Toronto-Dominion Centre and First Canadian Place.

This is also the closest station to One Yonge Street, the King Edward Hotel, St. James Cathedral, Toronto Sculpture Garden, St. Lawrence Hall and the St. Lawrence Market.

Surface connections

A transfer is required to connect between the subway system and these surface routes:

TTC routes serving the station include:

References

External links

Line 1 Yonge–University stations
PATH (Toronto)
Railway stations in Canada opened in 1954